South Korea and North Korea competed in some events at the 2018 Asian Games as a unified team, under the title "Korea" (IOC code: COR, from French name "Corée"). Both nations also marched together under a unified flag during the opening and closing ceremonies.

Korea claimed their first gold medal at the Games in the women's 500m canoeing event. The national folksong "Arirang" was played in the awarding ceremony.

Background
In June 2018, representatives from both South Korea and North Korea agreed to march together under a unified flag and form combined teams to compete in the Asian Games, similar to what they did earlier in the year at the 2018 Winter Olympics.

The Olympic Council of Asia (OCA) has stated that the size of the Unified Korea teams shall not exceed the athlete quota which applies to teams of other participating nations the Asian Games. The two countries agreed to field teams in full 5-a-side women's basketball, men's and women's dragon boat, and men's and women's rowing

Medalists
The following the unified Korean competitors won medals at the Games. In the by discipline sections below, medalists' names are bolded.

M man, W woman

Competitors
The following is a list of the number of competitors representing the unified Korea that participated at the Games:

Basketball 

Summary

5x5 basketball
Korea women's team drawn in group X at the Games.

Women's tournament

Roster
The following is the unified Korea roster in the women's basketball tournament of the 2018 Asian Games. Kwak Joo-yeong from South Korea did not play.

Group X

Quarterfinal

Semifinal

Final

Canoeing

The Korea team participated in both men's and women's dragon boat.

Traditional boat race

Drummer (D) and Steerer (S) need not be of the same gender.

Rowing

Korea participated in the following three events - the lightweight men's four, lightweight men's eight, and lightweight women's double sculls.

See also
 Korea at the 2018 Asian Para Games

References

Nations at the 2018 Asian Games
2018
2018
Asian Games
Asian Games
Asian Games 2018